Jessica Stretton,  (born 23 March 2000) is a British Paralympic archer with cerebral palsy.

In the 2016 Summer Paralympics, her debut Paralympics, Stretton won her first Paralympic medal, which was gold, at the age of 16. She became Great Britain's youngest ever medallist in archery.

Stretton was appointed Member of the Order of the British Empire (MBE) in the 2017 New Year Honours for services to archery.

References

Paralympic archers of Great Britain
Archers at the 2016 Summer Paralympics
Paralympic gold medalists for Great Britain
Living people
Members of the Order of the British Empire
2000 births
British female archers
Medalists at the 2016 Summer Paralympics
Paralympic medalists in archery
Archers at the 2020 Summer Paralympics
21st-century British women